Behind the Orange Curtain is a live album by heavy metal band BulletBoys.  It was recorded in 2002 or 2003.

Track list

Personnel 
 Carlos Bernal - Executive Producer
 Ryan Hafer - Engineer, Mixing
 Marq Torien - Vocals, Producer
 Tommy Pittman - Guitar
 Jimmy Nelson - Bass
 Pete Newman - Drums

References 

BulletBoys albums
2007 live albums